Dangihat was a village development committee in Morang District in the Koshi Zone of south-eastern Nepal. It lies west of Bahuni. It consisted of 9 wards. People of different castes lived here, mainly Brahmin, Chhetri, Khawas, Rai, Limbu, and Rajbanshi. At the time of the 1991 Nepal census it had a population of 15,639 people living in 2992 individual households.

References

Populated places in Morang District